The human condition is the experience of existence and life as humans. 

Human condition may also refer to:

Music 
The Human Condition (Saga album), 2009
The Human Condition (Man Must Die album), 2007
The Human Condition (Jon Bellion album), 2016
The Human Condition (Black Stone Cherry album), 2020
Human Conditions, music album by Richard Ashcroft
Exhibit B: The Human Condition, a 2010 album by Exodus
The Human Condition, short-lived band featuring electric bassist Jah Wobble

Other uses 
The Human Condition (Magritte), a 1933 painting by surrealist painter René Magritte
The Human Condition, a 1958 book by political theorist Hannah Arendt
The Human Condition (novel), a 1958 six-part Japanese novel by Junpei Gomikawa
La condition humaine (English title: Man's Fate), a 1933 novel by André Malraux
The Human Condition (film series), a film trilogy directed by Masaki Kobayashi
The Human Condition (TV series), Korean TV program

See also
 Books of Blood#"The Inhuman Condition", story and play by Clive Barker in the Fourth Book of Blood, which was published under that title in the US
 The Inhuman Condition an album by Sam Roberts